Beal Wong (1906-1962) was an American actor from California. Wong acted in films from 1933 to 1962. Some of the films he appeared in were The Big Bluff, China, Women in the Night, Little Tokyo, U.S.A.. He also appeared in The Secret Code. He played the Chinese Radio Listener in Earth vs. the Flying Saucers.

Biography
Wong was born in Boise, Idaho, to parents who had immigrated to the United States from China. One of his brothers, Bruce Wong, also became an actor as an adult.

In 1933, he had a small part in the film Stage Mother. In 1936, he starred in Sum Hun, a film produced by his brother Bruce. In 1944 he played Toma Nogato  in The Purple Heart, a film that starred Dana Andrews. He played part in Flower Drum Song in 1961,  the Pastor in the 1962 film Experiment in Terror with Glenn Ford and Lee Remick. In the television series The Bachelor Father, he had the role of Peter's Grandpa Ling.

Wong died in Los Angeles, California, on February 6, 1962, aged 55.

Filmography 
 1933 Stage Mother
 1942 The Secret Code - Quito

References

External links
 
 
 Beal Wong at allmovie.com

1906 births
1962 deaths
American male film actors
People from Boise, Idaho
Male actors from Idaho
American people of Chinese descent
20th-century American male actors